This is a list of airlines which have an Air Operator Certificate issued by the General Civil Aviation Authority of United Arab Emirates.

Scheduled airlines

Charter airlines

Government airlines

Cargo airlines

See also 
List of airlines
List of defunct airlines of United Arab Emirates
List of defunct airlines of Asia

References

 
Airlines
United Arab Emirates
Airlines
United Arab Emirates